Anglo-Indian is a term used to refer to a community of people of mixed British and Indian ancestry. Historically, these people were called "Eurasian" and "Anglo-Indian" meant people of European descent born in India.

Anglo-Indian may also refer to language topics such as:
Indian English
Regional differences and dialects in Indian English
Hinglish
Indian English literature
List of English words of Indian origin
List of English words of Persian origin

Anglo-Indian may also refer to:
Anglo-Indian Wars
India–United Kingdom relations
Anglo-Indian Canadian
Anglo-Indian cuisine